District School Board Ontario North East (DSB1; DSB Ontario North East; known as English-language Public District School Board No. 1 prior to 1999) is an Ontario English public school board serving Northeastern Ontario from Hearst to Temagami. It covers an extensive area of 25,000 square kilometres. The corporate office is located in Schumacher at 153 Croatia Avenue and a secondary office is located in New Liskeard at 198022 River Road.

The school board offers English, French Immersion and Alternate Education programming, including the Early Learning Kindergarten Program with full-day junior and senior kindergarten programs in every elementary school since 2000. The board also has a strong online learning community through e-Learning Ontario of the Ontario Ministry of Education.

Schools
District School Board Ontario North East operates 32 schools (23 elementary, 9 secondary, 1 alternate education).

Elementary
Bertha Shaw Public School, South Porcupine
Central Public School, Kirkland Lake
Clayton Brown Public School, Hearst
Cochrane Public School, Cochrane
Diamond Jubilee Public School, Kapuskasing
Elk Lake Public School, Elk Lake
Englehart Public School, Englehart
Federal Public School, Kirkland Lake
Golden Avenue Public School, South Porcupine
Iroquois Falls Public School, Iroquois Falls
Joseph H. Kennedy Public School, Matheson
Kerns Public School, Kerns
Kirkland Lake District Composite School, Kirkland Lake
New Liskeard Public School, New Liskeard
Pinecrest Public School, Timmins
Porcupine Regional School, South Porcupine
R. Ross Beattie Senior Public School, Timmins
Roland Michener Intermediate School, South Porcupine
Schumacher Public School, Schumacher
Smooth Rock Falls Public School, Smooth Rock Falls
Temagami Public School, Temagami
Timmins Centennial Public School, Timmins
W. Earle Miller Public School, Timmins

Secondary
École Secondaire Cochrane High School, Cochrane
Englehart High School, Englehart
Hearst High School, Hearst
Iroquois Falls Secondary School, Iroquois Falls 
Kapuskasing District High School, Kapuskasing
Kirkland Lake District Composite School, Kirland Lake
Roland Michener Secondary School, South Porcupine
Timiskaming District Secondary School, New Liskeard
Timmins High & Vocational School, Timmins

Alternate education
P.A.C.E. Centre, Timmins

Administration

Trustees
These are the elected trustees, serving a 4-year mandate ending on November 30, 2018.

See also
List of school districts in Ontario
List of high schools in Ontario

References

External links
Corporate website of District School Board Ontario North East

Education in Timmins
School districts in Ontario